The King of Prussia Volunteer Fire Company 9/11 Memorial is a memorial in King of Prussia CDP, Pennsylvania, that honors the lives lost in the September 11 attacks in 2001. The memorial is located adjacent to the King of Prussia Volunteer Fire Company station on Allendale Road across from the King of Prussia mall. The 9/11 Memorial consists of a monument, a gazebo, a patio, and an entrance path and stairs that commemorates the attacks on the World Trade Center and The Pentagon along with the crash of United Airlines Flight 93. Among the features of the memorial are two steel beams that came from the actual World Trade Center. The memorial was dedicated on the tenth anniversary of the attacks on September 11, 2011.

Location
The King of Prussia Volunteer Fire Company 9/11 Memorial is located in King of Prussia in Montgomery County, Pennsylvania adjacent to the King of Prussia Volunteer Fire Company station on Allendale Road, across from the King of Prussia mall. The memorial is close to U.S. Route 202, Interstate 76, U.S. Route 422, and the Pennsylvania Turnpike.

Description

The King of Prussia Volunteer Fire Company 9/11 Memorial is the largest memorial commemorating the September 11 attacks in Montgomery County and consists of four features: the 9/11 Monument, the World Trade Center Patio, the William C. Daywalt Sr. Memorial Gazebo, and the Entrance Pathway and Stairs. The World Trade Center Patio shows the layout of the site of the World Trade Center in New York City, displaying the seven buildings, the central plaza, and the four streets that surround the site. The patio is accurately oriented north–south as it actually was and is in 1/52nd scale. The 9/11 Monument is designed to commemorate the four events that happened during the attacks. The concrete base and walkway around the monument is circular shaped to symbolize the circular hole that was left in the ground from the crash of United Airlines Flight 93 in Shanksville, Pennsylvania. Within the circular base is a pyramidal pentagon made of granite that symbolizes The Pentagon in Arlington, Virginia and the crash of American Airlines Flight 77 into the building; the granite pentagon is in 1/104th scale. From the top of the pentagon rises two stainless steel tops representing the two towers of the World Trade Center, which are in 1/52nd scale. On top of the stainless steel tops sits two steel beams from the World Trade Center that were recovered from Ground Zero, oriented to represent the elevator cores in the two buildings. The length of the circumference of the circle symbolizes the 1 square acre footprint of each tower of the World Trade Center, with a square acre being  on each side. The tops of the World Trade Center towers have 40 lights that represents the passengers and crew killed in the crash of United Airlines Flight 93, with 20 lights in each tower oriented in a circle.

If one stands at the center of the World Trade Center Patio and looks directly at the center of the 9/11 Monument, the line of sight will show where American Airlines Flight 11 crashed into the far side of the North Tower of the World Trade Center and where United Airlines Flight 175 crashed into the near side of the South Tower of the World Trade Center. If one stands at the center of the William C. Daywalt Sr. Memorial Gazebo and looks directly at the center of the 9/11 Monument, the line of sight will show where American Airlines Flight 77 crashed into the far side of The Pentagon and also traces the flight bearing of United Airlines Flight 93 before it crashed in Shanksville, Pennsylvania.

History
In April 2011, the King of Prussia Volunteer Fire Company received two pieces of steel from the World Trade Center to incorporate into the memorial. Construction of the 9/11 Memorial was originally planned to begin in July 2011, but was moved up a month after the death of Osama bin Laden on May 2, 2011. The memorial was designed by Charles Edwin McDonald Jr. and was constructed by Joseph J. White Jr. The 9/11 Memorial was dedicated by the King of Prussia Volunteer Fire Company on September 11, 2011, which marked the tenth anniversary of the attacks. The dedication ceremony was attended by the general public along with various local, state, and federal officials. The ceremony featured the unveiling of a custom-made motorcycle from Orange County Choppers commemorating the 10th anniversary of the September 11 attacks.

Every year, the King of Prussia Volunteer Fire Company hosts the 9/11 Memorial Run, a 5K run and 1 mile walk to remember the attacks and raise funds to support the memorial.

References

External links

Official website

Monuments and memorials in Pennsylvania
Memorials for the September 11 attacks
Buildings and structures in Montgomery County, Pennsylvania
2011 sculptures
2011 establishments in Pennsylvania
Upper Merion Township, Montgomery County, Pennsylvania